is a digital song by Kenta Kiritani. It was pre-released from July 31 to August 31, 2015 through LISMO store, and then released on December 2, 2015. It was certified as Million in April 2016 by RIAJ. It's an Okinawan folk song.

Track listing 
  'Umi no Koe'  (3:47) Lyrics: Makoto Shinohara / Composition: Masaru Shimabukuro (BEGIN) / Arrangement: Hiroaki YamashitaSanshin: Kenta Kiritani

Chart

References

2015 songs